Stephen Irwin or Steve Irwin may refer to:
 Stephen Irwin (architect) (1944–2019), Canadian architect
 Steve Irwin (attorney) (born 1959), American attorney and politician 
 Stephen Irwin (judge) (born 1953), Lord Justice of Appeal
 Steve Irwin (1962–2006), Australian wildlife expert and television personality
 Stephen M. Irwin (born 1966), Australian novelist and filmmaker
 Steve Irwin (curler) (born 1982), Canadian curler
 Steve Irwin (rugby league) (born 1983), Australian rugby league player
 Steven Irwin (born 1990), English footballer
 Stephen Irwin (fl. 1990s–2010s), Ulster Defence Association member and perpetrator of the Greysteel massacre
MY Steve Irwin, flagship of the Sea Shepherd Conservation Society

See also
Steve Erwin (born 1960), American comic book artist

sr:Стив Ервин